New Pine Creek (formerly, Pine Creek) is a census-designated place in Modoc County, California. Its population is 87 as of the 2020 census, down from 98 from the 2010 census.
A 1913 book described Pine Creek as being on Goose Lake and having a population of 300.

Despite straddling the California-Oregon border (part of the community is in Oregon), New Pine Creek is not the northernmost settlement in the state of California. A surveying error in 1868 placed the actual border half a mile south of the statutory border (the 42nd parallel). Delegations from California and Oregon held talks on the issue in 1984 after the error was discovered, but did not ultimately change New Pine Creek's status.

Geography
According to the United States Census Bureau, the CDP covers an area of 2.3 square miles (5.9 km), all land.

Demographics
The 2010 United States Census reported that New Pine Creek had a population of 98. The racial makeup of New Pine Creek was 89 (90.8%) White, 0 (0.0%) African American, 0 (0.0%) Native American, 0 (0.0%) Asian, 1 (1.0%) Pacific Islander, 0 (0.0%) from other races, and 8 (8.2%) from two or more races. Hispanic or Latino of any race were 4 persons (4.1%).

The Census reported that 98 people (100% of the population) lived in households, 0 (0%) lived in non-institutionalized group quarters, and 0 (0%) were institutionalized.

There were 53 households, out of which 9 (17.0%) had children under the age of 18 living in them, 20 (37.7%) were opposite-sex married couples living together, 5 (9.4%) had a female householder with no husband present, 2 (3.8%) had a male householder with no wife present.  There were 6 (11.3%) unmarried opposite-sex partnerships, and 1 (1.9%) same-sex married couples or partnerships. 18 households (34.0%) were made up of individuals, and 13 (24.5%) had someone living alone who was 65 years of age or older. The average household size was 1.85.  There were 27 families (50.9% of all households); the average family size was 2.26.

The population was spread out, with 10 people (10.2%) under the age of 18, 1 people (1.0%) aged 18 to 24, 13 people (13.3%) aged 25 to 44, 43 people (43.9%) aged 45 to 64, and 31 people (31.6%) who were 65 years of age or older.  The median age was 55.5 years. For every 100 females, there were 122.7 males.  For every 100 females age 18 and over, there were 104.7 males.

The homeowner vacancy rate was 2.7%; the rental vacancy rate was 10.5%.  62 people (63.3% of the population) lived in owner-occupied housing units and 36 people (36.7%) lived in rental housing units.

Climate

Politics

See also 

 New Pine Creek, OR

References

Census-designated places in Modoc County, California
Census-designated places in California